Baby Head or Babyhead is a ghost town in Llano County, Texas, United States. The townsite and associated Baby Head Cemetery lies along Texas State Highway 16 about nine miles north of Llano. Babyhead Mountain lies about 4000 feet to the west and rises about 250 feet above the site.

According to the book 1001 Texas Place Names, the name "Baby Head" was given to the town following an attack by Indians where the head of a baby belonging to one of the settlers was placed atop a pole. Besides the mountain, a nearby creek also bears the name.

References

Unincorporated communities in Llano County, Texas
Unincorporated communities in Texas